Gooya is a Persian-language website started by Belgium-based journalist Farshad Bayan in 1998.

At that time, there were a few Iran-related websites and most Persian media did not have online editions. Manually prepared electronic copies of popular Persian journals (prepared by Bayan), such as the magazine Payam-e Emrooz, were a popular feature of Gooya. With the wave of Iranian websites and weblogs in the following years, their links appeared on Gooya and the website remained one of the most popular Persian websites.

Gooya started its own independent news section, Gooya News, a few years later. Analyses by journalists and political figures, with political opinions ranging from far left to far right, are an exclusive feature of Gooya News among Persian websites.

External links
 Gooya.com
Farshad Bayan's interview with BBC Persian 
Farshad Bayan's interview with ITNA 

Belgian news websites
1998 establishments in Belgium
Persian-language websites